Wildhorse Creek is a tributary of Alvord Lake in Harney County in the U.S. state of Oregon. It originates at a spring on Steens Mountain and flows generally south through Wildhorse Canyon to the shallow alkaline lake, south of the Alvord Desert and north of the unincorporated community of Fields.

Near the headwaters, the creek enters and exits Wildhorse Lake, which lies in a hanging valley. The upper  of the creek, including Wildhorse Lake, are part of the National Wild and Scenic Rivers System. In addition, a  tributary, Little  Wildhorse Creek, is part of the system. Wildhorse Creek and Little Wildhorse Creek flow through the Steens Mountain Wilderness before entering private land at lower elevations.

Designated "wild", the creek's watershed is home to mule deer, elk, bighorn sheep and pronghorn.

The ghost town of Andrews, Oregon, lies in the Wildhorse Valley west of the creek. Slightly north of the ghost town is the Wildhorse Valley Airport.

Tributaries
From source to mouth, the named tributaries of Wildhorse Creek begin with Little Wildhorse Creek, which flows into the main stem in Wildhorse Canyon. In the Wildhorse Valley east of Steens Mountain, Willow, Willow Spring, Deppy, Stonehouse, Spring, Wilson, Andrews, Butte, Juniper, and Miranda creeks enter the main stem. All the tributaries enter from the right.

See also
 List of rivers of Oregon
 List of National Wild and Scenic Rivers

References

External links
 National Wild and Scenic Rivers System

Rivers of Harney County, Oregon
Rivers of Oregon
Wild and Scenic Rivers of the United States